LATC may refer to:

 Los Altos Town Crier, a newspaper in Los Altos, California
 Los Angeles Theatre Center, a theatre complex in Downtown Los Angeles
 Los Angeles Tennis Club